27th NSFC Awards
January 3, 1993

Best Film: 
 Unforgiven 
The 27th National Society of Film Critics Awards, given on 3 January 1993, honored the best filmmaking of 1992.

Winners

Best Picture 
1. Unforgiven
2. The Crying Game
3. The Player

Best Director 
1. Clint Eastwood – Unforgiven
2. Robert Altman – The Player
3. Neil Jordan – The Crying Game

Best Actor 
1. Stephen Rea – The Crying Game
2. Clint Eastwood – Unforgiven
3. Denzel Washington – Malcolm X

Best Actress 
1. Emma Thompson – Howards End
2. Susan Sarandon – Lorenzo's Oil and Light Sleeper
3. Gong Li – Raise the Red Lantern (Da hong deng long gao gao gua)
3. Pernilla August – The Best Intentions (Den goda viljan)

Best Supporting Actor 
1. Gene Hackman – Unforgiven
2. Jaye Davidson – The Crying Game
3. Delroy Lindo – Malcolm X

Best Supporting Actress 
1. Judy Davis – Husbands and Wives
2. Miranda Richardson – The Crying Game, Damage and Enchanted April
3. Vanessa Redgrave – Howards End

Best Screenplay 
1. David Webb Peoples – Unforgiven
2. Neil Jordan – The Crying Game
3. Michael Tolkin – The Player

Best Cinematography 
1. Zhao Fei – Raise the Red Lantern (Da hong deng long gao gao gua)
2. Jean de Segonzac – Laws of Gravity
3. Jack N. Green – Unforgiven

Best Foreign Language Film 
1. Raise the Red Lantern (Da hong deng long gao gao gua)
2. The Match Factory Girl (Tulitikkutehtaan tyttö)
3. The Best Intentions (Den goda viljan)

Best Documentary 
1. American Dream
2. Brother's Keeper
3. A Brief History of Time

Special Citation 
Another Girl, Another Planet

References

External links
Past Awards

1992
National Society of Film Critics Awards
National Society of Film Critics Awards
National Society of Film Critics Awards